Golden Hill Platform railway station served the suburb of Golden Hill, Pembrokeshire, Wales, from 1909 to 1940 on the Pembroke and Tenby Railway.

History 
The station was opened on 1 July 1909 by the Great Western Railway. It closed on 5 February 1940.

References 

Disused railway stations in Pembrokeshire
Former Great Western Railway stations
Railway stations in Great Britain opened in 1909
Railway stations in Great Britain closed in 1940
1909 establishments in Wales
1940 disestablishments in Wales